The Pythias Lodge Building in San Diego, California, also known as Community Arts Complex or Intercultural Council of the Arts, is a Beaux Arts architecture building built in 1911.  It was listed on the National Register of Historic Places in 1981.

References

Clubhouses on the National Register of Historic Places in California
National Register of Historic Places in San Diego
Beaux-Arts architecture in California
Buildings and structures completed in 1911
Buildings and structures in San Diego
Knights of Pythias buildings